Xinzhou Wutaishan Airport , formerly Dingxiang Airport, is a civilian and military dual-use airport in Dingxiang County, Shanxi Province, China.  It serves the city of Xinzhou and Wutaishan, a Buddhist sacred mountain and World Heritage Site.  The airport is located 33 kilometers from Xinzhou.  Construction started in June 2010 with a total investment of 476 million yuan, and the airport was opened on 26 December 2015.

Facilities
The airport has one runway that is 2,600 meters long and 45 meters wide, and a 4,000 square meter terminal building.  It is projected to handle 350,000 passengers annually by 2020.

Airlines and destinations

See also
List of airports in China
List of the busiest airports in China
List of People's Liberation Army Air Force airbases

References

Airports in Shanxi
Chinese Air Force bases
Airports established in 2015
Xinzhou
2015 establishments in China